Khalid Ghuloom (born 18 August 1996) is an Emirati professional footballer who plays as a winger for Al Fujairah.

Career statistics

Club

Career statistics

References

External links
 

1996 births
Living people
Emirati footballers
Association football wingers
Sharjah FC players
Khor Fakkan Sports Club players
Al Urooba Club players
Fujairah FC players
UAE Pro League players
UAE First Division League players